Herzel Yankel Tsam (1835–1915) was a Jewish cantonist in the Russian Empire, one of only nine Jewish officers in the Tsarist army in the 19th century who didn't convert to Christianity.

Drafted as a 17-year-old Cantonist, Tsam served in Tomsk, Siberia.  Tsam became an officer in 1873 (his fellow officers attested to his qualities in the promotion petitions) and, after forty-one years of service, he was retired with a rank and pension of captain. The promotion was granted on the day of his retirement, so he would have the pension, but wouldn't be able to serve as a colonel. An able commander and administrator, he turned one of the worst companies of his regiment into one of the best.

After retirement, Tsam took an active part in the Jewish community of Tomsk.

See also
History of the Jews in Russia and the Soviet Union

References

Further reading

 «История возникновения в Томске военно-молитвенной солдатской школы» (Томск, 1909).

1835 births
1915 deaths
Jews from the Russian Empire
Russian Jews in the military
Imperial Russian Army officers